Kristy M. Ainslie is a Fred Eshelman Distinguished Professor in pharmaceutical science at University of North Carolina at Chapel Hill in the 
Eshelman School of Pharmacy and chair of the Division of Pharmacoengineering and Molecular Pharmaceutics. She is also joint in the UNC School of Medicine Department of Microbiology and Immunology and affiliated faculty in the UNC/NC State joint Biomedical Engineering department. Additionally, she is part of UNC's Biological and Biomedical Sciences Program (BBSP).

Background
Ainslie completed her Bachelors of Science in Chemical engineering from Michigan State University in 1999. After working as an environmental engineer at Malcolm Pirnie, she began graduate school at Penn State as a fellow in the Huck Institutes of the Life Science. In 2003, she completed her Masters of Science in Chemical engineering under John Tarbell, focusing on shear stress modulation of vascular smooth muscle cell contraction. Two years later in 2005, she completed her PhD in Chemical engineering under Micheal Pishko, focusing on protein adhesion and cell responses to nanomaterials. After a brief post doc at the microcantilever start-up Protiveris, she worked with Lloyd Whitman at the United States Naval Research Laboratory. In 2006, she began a post doc at University of San Francisco in the Department of Bioengineering and Therapeutic Sciences under the direction of Tejal Desai. The focus of Ainslie's research at UCSF was on microfabricated oral drug delivery carriers and immune responses to planar nanomaterials.

Ainslie began her career as a tenure track Assistant Professor at Ohio State University in the School of Pharmacy in the Division of Pharmaceutics and Pharmaceutical Chemistry. In 2014, Ainslie moved to the University of North Carolina at Chapel Hill and the UNC Eshelman School of Pharmacy Division of Pharmacoengineering and Molecular Pharmaceutics as an Associate Professor.

Career
Ainslie has several areas of focus for her lab:
 Advancement of acetalated dextran: Establishment of an ethanol producing version of acetalated dextran, in comparison to the methanol producing version first reported by Jean Fréchet. Exploiting the unique degradation rates of acetalated dextran, the Ainslie Lab was the first to show that fine tuning of antigen and adjuvant release can be used to optimize microparticulate vaccines.
 Antigen specific immune tolerance: One of the first to apply microparticles for autoimmune therapeutic vaccines, using acetalated dextran to suppress disease related inflammation
 Host-directed therapeutics: First identifying OSU-03012 antiparasitic activity against Leishmania donovani. To improve the delivery of this compound, since it has a narrow therapeutic window, the Ainslie lab encapsulated it in acetalated dextran microparticles and also applied the formulation for Salmonella enterica and Francisella tularensis infection. 
 Electrospray for vaccines: Reported the first use of electrospray for formation of protein based microparticle vaccines made of acetalated dextran. The application of electrospray was then expanded to encapsulate the hydrophillic STING agonist cGAMP. 
 Electrospun acetalated dextran nanofibers: Used for interstitial delivery of chemotherapeutics for glioblastoma.

References

External links
 

Year of birth missing (living people)
Living people
American chemical engineers
University of North Carolina at Chapel Hill faculty
Michigan State University alumni
Penn State College of Engineering alumni